Ambica Airlines is a defunct airline, which was based at Bombay, India .

Ambica Airlines began local services on 10 March 1947.  The fleet consisted of  DC-3s, with a three Beech 18s and other types. The airline was associated and subsidiary  of the Shri Ambica Steam Navigation Company, a shipping company owned & established by Seth Vijaysinh Govindji & Jagmal Raja Chauhan in 1945.

Ambica Airline operated on 944 kilometers route, twice-weekly services Bombay-Vadodara-Ahmedabad and thrice-weekly Bombay-Bhuj-Rajkot-Jamnagar-Morbi route.
The airline was started by businessman Seth Haridas Madhavdas, Seth Vithaldas Kanji, Seth Vijaysinh Govindji  and Rai Bahadur Jagmal Raja,  having its head office at Bombay.

The airlines closed in the year 1949 due to insufficient traffic and other litigations.

References

Defunct airlines of India
Airlines established in 1947
Airlines disestablished in 1949
Indian companies established in 1947
1949 disestablishments in India
Companies based in Mumbai